Ebrahim Abadi (also Romanized as Ebrāhim Ābādi; 15 August 1934 – 31 October 2019) was an Iranian stage and film actor. Abadi played in famous movies including Mokhtarnameh, On Tiptoes, Dar Chashm-e Baad and Grand Cinema.

Biography 
Ebrahimabadi was first seen in the Bagh-e-Tabriz alley on August 15, 1934. He went to school in Tabriz until his fifth grade and finished high school in Tehran. During high school, he was interested in the art of performing until he finally tried in the theatre classes of fine arts of the country, which was composed by foreign educators in schools, and after passing a year under the supervision of Davidson and Kotkim B, he went to the art school and under the supervision of professors such as Ali Asghar Garmori and Hoshang Saring To continue his studies in Prague, Czechoslovakia, he graduated from the Academy of Dramatic Arts five years later. He also works in professional theatres. After 14 years, he returned to Iran from Czechoslovakia and was employed in the theatre and show house programs and worked in some provincial centers (7 years in Urmia, 1 year in Gorgan and 8 years in Tabriz). Abadi has taken up classes and theatre groups in all of those cities and has created nearly 60 plays by the efforts of the emerging groups. Abadi retired from the theatre in 1993.

He was a supervisor of the theatre festival in Tehran and the cities several times. He was one of the organizers of the Martyrs Mehreb Festival in Tabriz for four periods and was a intensive theatre course for the participants. He was also a member of the Central Council of the Iranian Cinema Actors Association in the Cinema House and four courses of the Iranian Film Reviewer in the Celebration of the House of Cinema.

Personal life 
Ebrahimabadi married Maliheh Ebrahimi as a young man and had children. Maliheh Ebrahimi Garimore and her actress was born in Tabriz in 1930 and has a diploma in face-to-face from Prague. He played his first game in the show with Sharafs and entered the cinema with the film Diamond 33 in 1967.

Activities 

 Graduated from The Faculty of Dramatic Arts (Prague) in 1967.
 The beginning of the theatre in 1953 with the play in the performance of the son of Haqbaz.
 The beginning of cinematic activity in 1984 with the film Pilgrim Khalaf (Yadollah Nosari).

In addition to his theatrical activities, he played many films and series in all his professional years, including "Kafor Perfume Jasmine" films, "Tokyo Without Stopping," "100 years to these years." The series "Mokhtarnameh", "Powerchin", "10th Night" and "Lost Innocence" are among his well-known works on TELEVISION.

Illness and death 
Abadi has been in a coma since October 10, 2019 due to illness esoptous in a hospital in Tehran. He underwent six surgery on October 21, 2019, and then went to a room. He died on 17 November 2019.

Filmography

Cinema 

 Wall (2007)
 100 years to these years (2007)
 Whatever you want (2006)
 Remote (2005)
 Qalkalk (2005)
 I am not bin Laden (2004)
 Tokyo Without Stopping (2002)
 Sweet Marbe (2001)
 My Favorite Wife (2000)
 Star Sky (1999)
 Smell of Kafur, Yas Perfume (1999)
 Mummy 3 (1999)
 The Badaskaran (1997)
 Behind the Night Wall (1997)
 World of Upside (1997)
 Abraham (1996)
 Summer Holidays (1995)
 Conspiracy (1995)
 Invisible Man (1995)
 Yahya (1995)
 Smell of Good Life (1994)
 Hassert (1994)
 I want to survive (1994)
 All my girls (1993)
 Satain's Call (1992)
 Unfinished Man (1992)
 Apartment No. 13 (1990)
 Khatoon Property (1990)
 All One Nation (1980)
 June 5 Flight (1989)
 Doll Scins (1989)
 Dust Crossing (1989)
 Window (1988)
 The Good Wedding (1988)
 Grand Cinema (1988)
 Station (1987)
 Sand Tracking (1987)
 Bykut (1985)
 Alarms (1985)
 Pilgrim Khalaf (1984)

TV series 
 Under the City's Skin (2001)
 Tenth Night (2002)

Awards 

 Crystal Simorgh: as Best Actor in Second Role, 9th Fajr Film Festival for Apartment No. 13.

Notes

External links

Ebrahim Abadi in Internet database of Soureh Cinema

1934 births
2019 deaths
Iranian male film actors
Iranian male stage actors
Iranian male television actors
People from Tabriz